Michael Crimmins (born 1974 in Birr, County Offaly) is an Irish sportsperson.  He plays hurling with his local club Athenry and is a member of the Galway senior inter-county team from 1999 until 2002.

References 

1974 births
Living people
Athenry hurlers
Galway inter-county hurlers
Connacht inter-provincial hurlers
Hurling goalkeepers